Pain Seyyed Kola (also Romanized as Pā’īn Seyyed Kolā; also known as Seyyed Kolā-ye Pā’īn) is a village in Gatab-e Jonubi Rural District, Gatab District, Babol County, Mazandaran Province, Iran. At the 2006 census, its population was 366, in 91 families.

References 

Populated places in Babol County